The Patria PML 127 OWS (overhead weapon system) is a Finnish-developed remote weapon station (RWS) which mounts a 12.7 mm NSV machine gun and smoke canister dischargers.

The turret is electro-hydraulically driven and can traverse in a full 360° circle and can elevate between -8° to +48°.

The operator has a Zeiss PERI-Z16A1 sight and NAE 200 day/night periscopic sight with GEN II+ image intensifier. The system can also be fitted with a CCD or thermal camera.

It can be mounted to various vehicles. It is manufactured by Patria.

Operators

XA-203

References

Vehicle weapons
Remote weapon stations
Goods manufactured in Finland